Carolus Adrianus Johannes "Karel" Kreutz (born 1954) is a Dutch orchidologist, botanical writer and taxonomist, currently affiliated with the Centre for Biodiversity Naturalis in Leiden, Netherlands.
He is regarded as an exceptionally experienced orchidologist, and has published orchid floras of Cyprus, Turkey, Rhodes, Crimea, Netherlands, Belgium and Germany, and is currently preparing a major overview  in ten volumes of all orchid taxa in Europe, North Africa and the Middle East, employing modern taxonomy, nomenclature and research techniques.

Kreutz has published over 200 scientific papers, and is the scientific authority for over four hundred plant taxa, predominantly in the Orchidaceae, but also in the genus Orobanche.

Honours
The following orchid species have been named in recognition of Kreutz' work on the Orchidaceae:
 (Orchidaceae) Ophrys kreutzii W.Hahn, R.Wegener & J.Mast
 (Orchidaceae) Ophrys × kreutziana P.Delforge

Publications

References

1954 births
Living people
Orchidologists
20th-century Dutch botanists
21st-century Dutch botanists